The 2008–09 Xtreme Soccer League season was the only season for the league. The members of the XSL's first season were four former MISL II teams: the Chicago Storm, the Detroit Ignition, the Milwaukee Wave, and the New Jersey Ironmen. The regular season kicked off on December 13, 2008, and concluded on April 5, 2009.

On March 29, 2009, the Detroit Ignition claimed the XSL championship when the New Jersey Ironmen defeated the Milwaukee Wave 15–14.

The league went on a one-year hiatus after its inaugural season but never returned to active play. The Milwaukee Wave joined the MISL III for the 2009–10 season.

League standings

Scoring leaders

GP = Games Played, G = Goals, A = Assists, Pts = Points

Source:

Players of the Month

Sources:

League awards
 Most Valuable Player: Danny Waltman, Detroit
 Offensive Player of the Year: Lucio Gonzaga, New Jersey
 Defensive Player of the Year: Josh Rife, Detroit
 Goalkeeper of the Year: Danny Waltman, Detroit
 Rookie of the Year: Marco Terminesi, Milwaukee
 Coach of the Year: Matt Johnson, Detroit

Source:

All-XSL Team

Source:

References

Xtreme Soccer League seasons
X
X